Beerwah is a rural town and locality in the hinterland of the Sunshine Coast Region, Queensland, Australia.

Australia Zoo, located here, is a major tourist attraction and is visited daily by large numbers of local, national and international tourists. Beerwah has transport links to Brisbane and northbound destinations via the Beerwah railway station on the Nambour and Gympie North railway line. Roads in the area include a bypass in the south of the town, Kilcoy-Beerwah Road and Steve Irwin Way.

Geography 
The main road through Beerwah is called Steve Irwin Way. It was formerly known as the Glasshouse Mountain Tourist Route and is accessed by the Bruce Highway, which bypassed the town in 1985. Kilcoy–Beerwah Road enters from the west.

History
The name Beerwah comes from the Kabi language (Turrbal dialect) word birrawaman, with birra meaning sky and wandum meaning climbing up.

Beerwah Post Office opened by August 1907 (a receiving office had been open from 1891).

The Coochin Creek Provisional School opened on 27 November 1888 with an initial enrolment of 19 students under teacher William Verrants. By the end of 1888, there were 43 students enrolled. It was on the main Peachester road,  from the Beerwah railway station. On 1 January 1909, it became Coochin Creek State School. In about November 1928, it was renamed Beerwah State School. The school celebrated its golden jubilee in 1938. On 10 July 1952, another Coochin Creek State School opened, but it closed on 11 March 1962.

On Saturday 26 September 1914, the local Anglican residents held a meeting to consider erecting a church in Beerwah. Mr Mawhinney donated a piece of land by the railway station. On Saturday 7 November 1914 Archdeacon Henry Le Fanu officially capped the first stump of the new church building. All the materials for the church and the labour were all donated so the church would be free of debt. On Saturday 6 March 1916, Archdeacon Le Fanu returned to officially open and dedicate St James' Anglican Church. In the 1990s, diminishing numbers in the congregations led to a decision to close a number of churches in the area. St James' was closed and sold for removal.

On 4 July 1991, the Mary MacKillop Catholic Centre was blessed and opened by Archbishop Francis Rush.  

Beerwah State High School opened on 1 January 1992.

The Beerwah Library opened in 2000.

Glasshouse Country Christian College was established on 31 January 2000  by the Glasshouse Country Baptist Church with an initial 16 students.

Glasshouse Country Uniting Church opened its church at Beerwah on 16 December 2000, The architects were Thomson Adsett Architects. It was a result of the merger of the Glasshouse Uniting Church, Beerwah Uniting Church, Landsborough Uniting Church and Mooloolah Uniting Church.

The median age was 39 years, compared to the national median age of 38. Aboriginal and Torres Strait Islander people made up 2.8% of the population. 77.2% of people were born in Australia. The next most common countries of birth were England 5.1% and New Zealand 4.8%. 90.8% of people only spoke English at home. The most common responses for religion in Beerwah were No Religion 32.8%, Anglican 17.2% and Catholic 14.4%.

Heritage listings 
Beerwah has a number of heritage-listed sites, including:

 53 Beerwah Parade: Beerwah Hotel
2719 Old Gympie Road: Site of Coochin Homestead
 Roys Road and Mawsons Road (Beerburrum State Forest): Beerburrum Scientific Area No 1
Roys Road, approximately 1 km east of Mawsons Road intersection: former Beerwah Forest Station and Arboretum
Simpson Street: Beerwah railway station

Transport
Beerwah is a growing hinterland town.  Transport links to Brisbane and northbound destinations at Beerwah railway station on the Nambour and Gympie North railway line.

A small bypass was constructed south of the town, including an overpass of the railway, a large roundabout at Roberts Road, and traffic signals at Kilcoy-Beerwah Road and Steve Irwin Way. This work opened to traffic in October 2009. As part of that project, however, the original level crossing was closed and demolished, causing concern among local residents who claimed it sliced the town in two. In 2010, many residents began to complain about the lack of signage to the town center. The town entrance now features two distinctive large directional signs, one at the Steve Irwin Way entrance, and one at the roundabout after travelling over the railway bridge.

Education 
Beerwah State School is a government primary (Early Childhood-6) school for boys and girls at 2788 Old Gympie Road. In 2018, the school had an enrolment of 367 students with 40 teachers (32 full-time equivalent) and 21 non-teaching staff (15 full-time equivalent). It includes a special education program.

Glasshouse Christian College  is a private primary and secondary (Prep-12) school for boys and girls at 58 Roberts Road. In 2018, the school had an enrolment of 1074 students with 75 teachers (70 full-time equivalent) and 67 non-teaching staff (48 full-time equivalent).

Beerwah State High School is a government secondary (7-12) school for boys and girls at 35 Roberts Road. In 2018, the school had an enrolment of 895 students with 86 teachers (79 full-time equivalent) and 44 non-teaching staff (30 full-time equivalent). It includes a  special education program.

Amenities 
The Sunshine Coast Regional Council operates a public library at 25 Peachester Road.

There are a range of national supermarkets, specialty shops, and a retirement village.

The Beerwah branch of the Queensland Country Women's Association meets at 39 Simpson Street.

Anglican church services are held at the Mary MacKillop Catholic Centre at 160 Peachester Road.

Glasshouse Country Uniting Church (also known as Beewah Uniting Church) is at 29 Twin Peaks Drive.

There are a number of parks in the locality, including:

 Beerwah Sports Ground, Roberts Rd, Beerwah
 Biondi Crescent Park

 CWA Park

 Cabrera Park

 Caralan Way Park

 Caralan Way/Emma Place Park 2

 Carnarvon Drive Bushland Park

 Chantilly Park

 Coochin Creek Riparian Zone on Steve Irwin Way

 Coochin Nature Park

 Esplanade

 Emma Place Park

 Foley Road Buffer

 Gowen Park

 Hibiscus Park

 Jubilee Park

 Kello Road Environmental Reserve

 Kindy Park

 Lachlan Crescent Busland Reserve

 Lachlan Crescent North Drainage Reserve

 Lachlan Crescent Park

 Lachlan Crescent South Drainage Reserve

 Lindeman Road Natural Amenity Reserve

 Mill Park

 Monarch Place Natural Amenity Reserve

 Monica Smith Park

 Newell Park

 Newells Rd Buffer

 Newton Park

 Old Peachester Road Natural Amenity Reserve

 Otto Northling Road Natural Amenity Reserve

 Otto Nothling Place Drainage Reserve

 Otto Nothling Place Park

 Park

 Parkside Drive Bushland Park

 Peachester Dr/Parkside Dr Walkway Link

 Pinelands Park

 Reserve

 Roberts Road Park

 Settlement Park

 Shaws Road Drainage Reserve

 Sidney Drive Bushland Reserve

 Sidney Drive Park

 Steve Irwin Way Buffer Kello Road Estate

 Thompson Road Buffer

 Turner Park

 Twin Peaks Park

 Whistler Place Open Space

 Woodgrove Boulevard Drainage Reserve

 Woodgrove Boulevard Park

 Woodgrove Esplanade Walkway 1

 Woodgrove Esplanade Walkway 2

 Woodgrove Stage 7

Attractions 
Australia Zoo is located in Beerwah. The zoo was founded by Bob Irwin and later made famous by his son, Steve Irwin. It is a major tourist attraction and is visited daily by large numbers of local, national and international tourists.

Another attraction, the Glass House mountain range, is located nearby. The largest mountain in the range, at 555m, is Mount Beerwah. Access to the Mount Beerwah summit route has been closed since 2008 due to the erosion and destabilization of some walking tracks, leading to a high risk of rock fall. 

The Big Mower, one of Australia's big things, is located in Beerwah.

Notable residents
 Lawrence Daws, painter and printmaker
 The Irwin family: Bob Irwin, Steve Irwin (deceased), Terri Irwin, Bindi Irwin, Robert Irwin, environmentalists and operators of Australia Zoo

See also

References

External links

 
 
Beerwah cemetery

Towns in Queensland
Suburbs of the Sunshine Coast Region
Localities in Queensland